Georgia Keeps Pulling on My Ring is the thirty-eighth studio album by American country music singer Conway Twitty. The album was released in 1978, by MCA Records.

Track listing

Charts

References

1978 albums
Conway Twitty albums
MCA Records albums
Albums produced by Owen Bradley